Joao Andre (born 28 May 1976) is a former Portuguese pole vault athlete who competed in the 2000 Summer Olympics. He achieved a height of 5.40, not enough to qualify him for the second round. His personal high mark is 5.60.

References

1976 births
Portuguese male pole vaulters
Athletes (track and field) at the 2000 Summer Olympics
Olympic athletes of Portugal
Living people